Okruglica may refer to:

 Okruglica (Svrljig), a village in Serbia
 Okruglica (Trstenik), a village in Serbia